Intralinks Holdings, Inc., founded in 1996, is a global technology provider of inter-enterprise content management and collaboration solutions. Its products serve the enterprise collaboration and strategic transaction markets, enabling the exchange, control, and management of information between organizations.

History
In 1996, John Muldoon and Mark Adams founded Intralinks. Major banks began using its product for loan syndication in 1997. In 2002, the firm created the world's first virtual data room (VDR), which enabled transacting parties to share information during the due diligence process in a secure environment.

In 2004, its customers completed over $5 trillion in syndicated loan transactions using Intralink products. The company was acquired by TA Associates in 2007, before becoming a publicly traded company on the New York Stock Exchange in 2010.

The company's initial public offering took place on August 6, 2010. Its initial price range was $14–$16, and the stock priced at $13. The company sold 11,000,000 shares and raised $143M. The lead underwriters were Deutsche Bank AG and Credit Suisse Group. The company had approximately $152M in debt at the time of the IPO and expected to use the vast majority of the returns from the offering to repay its obligations.

In 2011, Ron Hovsepian, previously CEO of Novell, Inc. joined Intralinks as CEO, President and Director. Under his leadership, the company developed Intralinks VIA and Intralinks DealNexus.

In 2013 the company launched morethanavdr.com, a website that specifically targets investment bank strategic advisors, legal advisors and corporate advisors.

According to the company, more than 2.7 million professionals at 988 of the Fortune 1000 companies use its products.

The company has 1,000 employees worldwide and has its global headquarters are in New York City.

Recent Developments

docTrackr

On April 23, 2014, Intralinks acquired docTrackr, a document security company. docTrackr's information rights management (IRM) technology enables users to protect and track PDF, Word, Excel and PowerPoint documents wherever those files are stored or shared. docTrackr combines analytics, audit trails and policy management of all document activities in a plug-in free deployment.

Intralinks VIA

Released in April 2013, Intralinks VIA enables users to share information outside of the network firewall. VIA encrypts every file shared within the platform and allows users to designate permissions. With the proper permission, users can download documents and collaborate freely together. VIA also includes an UNshare® feature allowing admins to withdraw information at any time, with an encryption that corrupts the files (and any copies) sent or saved. In January 2014, Intralinks announced a new version of its Intralinks VIA product, Intralinks VIA Enterprise, which supports complete content lifecycle management for the extended enterprise. It also has Intralinks Dealspace.

Dealnexus

In 2013, Intralinks acquired PE-Nexus and MergerID. Each of these offered clients a platform to find partners for mergers and acquisitions. Intralinks merged the two firms and renamed the newly created platform DealNexus, the largest global deal sourcing network. DealNexus’ client portfolio offers businesses a network to find partners. Once engaging in a deal, the Intralinks VDR allows parties to conduct due diligence.

Synchronoss
In 2016, Synchronoss Technologies agreed to acquire Intralinks Holdings, Inc. for $13.00 per share, or $821 million in equity value.
 Intralinks was subsequently sold by Synchronoss to affiliates of Siris Capital Group in 2017. In November 2018, SS&C Technologies Holdings, Inc. (Nasdaq: SSNC) purchased Intralinks for $1 billion in cash and $500 million in SSNC shares.

Headquarters

Intralinks maintains its corporate headquarters on the east side of Manhattan in New York City.  Other offices include: Boston, Chicago, San Francisco, São Paulo, London, Bucharest, Milan, Frankfurt, Hong Kong and Sydney.

References

External links

Companies formerly listed on the New York Stock Exchange
Information technology companies of the United States
Companies based in New York City
Companies established in 1997
2010 initial public offerings
2017 mergers and acquisitions
American corporate subsidiaries
2016 mergers and acquisitions
2018 mergers and acquisitions